Zamir Jaffri Cricket Stadium is a cricket stadium in Jhelum, Pakistan. It is named after Jhelumi poet Syed Zamir Jafri. It was a local district-level stadium, but now the Pakistan Cricket Board has upraised it for regional level events. Six extra cricket pitches have been constructed.

Gallery

See also
 Sport in Pakistan
 List of stadiums in Pakistan

References

Jhelum
Sport in Jhelum
Cricket grounds in Pakistan
Stadiums in Pakistan
Sports venues in Pakistan
Tourist attractions in Jhelum